Oumar Tourad Camara (born 1 September 1998) is a Guinean footballer who plays as a midfielder. In 2019, he featured for Kukësi on (loan).

Career statistics

Club

Notes

References

1998 births
Living people
Guinean footballers
Guinean expatriate footballers
Association football forwards
Kategoria Superiore players
Kategoria e Parë players
Besa Kavajë players
Besëlidhja Lezhë players
FK Kukësi players
People from Boké Region